The Somerindyck House was a house in Manhattan, New York City, U.S.. It was located in the middle of Broadway, above West 75th Street. While visiting the United States, Louis Philippe I taught in the house; he later served as the King of France.

Henry Farrer's 1870 etching of the house is in the collection of the Metropolitan Museum of Art.

References

Houses in Manhattan
Upper West Side
Louis Philippe I